Austin Bryan French (born February 13, 1994) is an American Christian musician, who plays Christian pop style contemporary worship music. He released his debut single, "Freedom Hymn", through Fair Trade Services on December 8, 2017. The song went on to receive radio play and ultimately peaked at No. 8 on the Billboard Hot Christian Songs chart.

Early and personal life
French grew up in the small town of Cordele, Georgia. When he was young, he wished to be a contemporary Christian artist who wrote songs that "shared his faith and passion for Jesus." He formed bands learning to take his music to stages, churches, and anyone who would listen. He began touring throughout his high school years. "We would fill up the church van or my best friend's Suburban and drive, praying that we would make it to the gigs without breaking down, just to play for 10 people and then do it again every weekend we could," says Austin. He saw a passion and calling from God to share music that was "rooted in the gospel." He began leading at Journey Church, in Tifton, Georgia at the age of 18 and became the full-time worship pastor. He met his wife, Joscelyn French, at the church. He led musicians and the congregation in worship for three years.

Music career

In 2014, Austin French was featured on the first season of the ABC TV show "Rising Star," He performed songs such as "Bless the Broken Road" and "If I Ain't Got You". He impressed millions of viewers, including guest judges Ludacris, Kesha, and Brad Paisley, and competed his way to the finale. He finished as the runner-up on the show and had the opportunity to share the stage with multi-platinum recording artist, Josh Groban. 

After departing from Rising Star, French began his journey into the CCM industry. He was led to his manager and CEO of One One 7, Jason Davis, a manager/partner with First Company Management. Through many writing trips to Nashville, Tennessee, Austin began to grow his ministry and develop into a true artist. His passion for ministry led him and his family to Delray Beach, Florida, serving as the worship pastor at The Avenue Church. While in Florida, French continued to write and travel to Nashville, writing songs and make friendships that would be vital to his future in the industry. After years of work, Austin signed a record deal with Fair Trade Services, a record label home for artists such as, The Newsboys, MercyMe, Phil Wickham, Laura Story, Hawk Nelson and several other successful Christian artists.

French released his debut single "Freedom Hymn" on December 8, 2017. A lyric video was released on September 19, 2017. The single went on to enter the Billboard Hot Christian Songs Top 10, peaking at No. 8. According to Billboard, the song increased seven percent to 6.8 million impressions, and peaked at No. 7 on the Christian Airplay chart. His debut album Wide Open was released on September 7, 2018 and features 12 songs, including his singles "Freedom Hymn", "Wide Open", "Why God", "Born Again", and "Good Feeling". The album went on to chart on the Billboard Top Christian Albums and Heatseekers Albums charts, at Nos. 30 and 9 respectively.

Discography

Albums

Extended plays

Singles

Promotional singles

Other charted songs

Other appearances

Competition singles

Awards

GMA Dove Awards 

|-
|rowspan="1"| 2019 || Austin French || New Artist of the Year || 
|}

References

External links
 

1994 births
Living people
American performers of Christian music
Musicians from Nashville, Tennessee
Songwriters from Tennessee